Georg Meyer may refer to:

 Georg Meyer (sport shooter) (born 1868), German sport shooter
 Georg Meyer (aviator) (1893–1926), German World War I fighter ace
 Georg Meyer (athlete), German Paralympic athlete

See also 
 George Meyer (disambiguation)